Petrified Sea Gardens, also once known as Ritchie Park, is a National Historic Landmark on Petrified Sea Gardens Road in  Saratoga Springs, New York.  It preserves a bed of ancient stromatolites in a Cambrian rock layer, which were the first to be recognized and understood for what they are.  The site was a private park open to the public for many years, but is now closed.  The site was designated a National Natural Landmark in 1967, and a National Historic Landmark in 1999.

Description and history
Although stromatolites can be found more widely, they are rarely exposed in this area because of later glacial action.

The structures now identified as stromatolites, which are marine algae growths, were first identified on this site in 1825, but what they were was unknown and the subject of scientific debate.  James Hall (1811–1898), the first State Paleontologist of New York, identified them as being organic and placed stromatolites in a new genus.  Pioneering female paleontologist Winifred Goldring (1888–1971), was the first to identify the creatures responsible for creating the structures found, and described those found here among the finest surviving specimens.  Samples from this site were later compared to stromatolites of more recent construction found in Australia.

In 1924, Robert F. Ritchie, a stonemason and amateur geologist who owned the property, opened a park to show them to the public.  The site was a childhood inspiration for paleontologists Stephen Jay Gould.  The site was most recently open as an educational site operated by a non-profit, the Friends of Petrified Sea Gardens until 2006.  It is currently closed to the public.

See also
James Hall Office, also a National Historic Landmark
List of National Historic Landmarks in New York
List of National Natural Landmarks in New York
National Register of Historic Places listings in Saratoga County, New York

References

External links
Museums USA about the site

National Historic Landmarks in New York (state)
National Natural Landmarks in New York (state)
Parks in Saratoga County, New York
National Register of Historic Places in Saratoga County, New York
Archaeological sites on the National Register of Historic Places in New York (state)